Mary  Nighy (born 17 July 1984) is an English actress and filmmaker.

Early life

Nighy was born in London. She is the daughter of actors Bill Nighy and Diana Quick. She was educated at the City of London School for Girls and Westminster School. Nighy graduated with first-class honours in English from University College London in 2006. She was a member of the National Youth Theatre.

Work
Nighy is a director of Foster Films. She has directed short films including Lulu and Player; the latter was written by Sam Hodges and premiered at the 2008 Miami Short Film Festival. She directed Hodges' play Lyre at the HighTide Festival in spring 2007. 

She was named one of the UK Film Council's 'Breakthrough Brits' in 2005.

Her debut feature as director, Alice, Darling, starring Anna Kendrick and Wunmi Mosaku, was released in January 2023.

Acting credits
Tormented (2009) as Helena
Marple: at Bertram's Hotel (2007, TV movie) as Brigit
Gallathea (2007, staged reading) as Phillida
Marie-Antoinette (2006) as Princesse de Lamballe
The Fine Art of Love: Mine Ha-Ha (2005) as Hidalla
Spooks (2004) (TV series) guest starring as Jemma Roberts
Rosemary & Thyme (2004, TV series) guest starring as Fern
The Lost Prince (2003, TV)
Invitation to the Waltz (2001, radio play)
The Young Ambassadors (1998, radio play)

References

External links
 
 Nighy, Mary at BFI

1984 births
Living people
21st-century English actresses
Actresses from London
Alumni of University College London
English film actresses
English film directors
English radio actresses
English television actresses
English theatre directors
National Youth Theatre members
People educated at the City of London School for Girls